This article displays the rosters for the participating teams at the 2015 FIBA Africa Club Championship.

Al Gezira Cairo

AD Bairro

ASCUT d'Atsinanana

Étoile Sportive Radès

Far Rabat

Inter Club Brazzaville

Kano Pillars

Petro Atlético

Primeiro de Agosto

Recreativo do Libolo

See also
 2015 FIBA Africa Championship squads

References

External links
 2014 FIBA Africa Champions Cup Participating Teams

FIBA Africa Clubs Champions Cup squads
FIBA